Miss Brazil 2021, officially Miss Universe Brazil 2021, was the 66th edition of the Miss Brazil pageant, and the first under the new Miss Universe Brazil management. The competition was filmed on 7 November 2021 on board the MSC Preziosa, and aired on 9 November. In order to preserve the secrecy of the results before its airdate, crowning moments for all three finalists were filmed, while only the one of the winner was aired.

Teresa Santos of Ceará was crowned as the winner and successor of Julia Gama of Rio Grande do Sul. Gama did not crown Santos as Miss Brazil amidst controversy between herself and the pageant organizers. Santos competed at Miss Universe 2021, but was unplaced.

Results

Contestants
27 contestants were selected to compete.

Notes

References

External links

2021 in Brazil
2021
2021 beauty pageants
Beauty pageants in Brazil
Entertainment events in Brazil
Competitions in Brazil